Downtown Airport  is a city-owned, public-use airport located in El Dorado, a city in Union County, Arkansas, United States.

Facilities and aircraft 
Downtown Airport covers an area of 88 acres (36 ha) at an elevation of 256 feet (78 m) above mean sea level. It has one runway designated 18/36 with an asphalt surface measuring 3,000 by 60 feet (914 x 18 m).

For the 12-month period ending June 30, 2007, the airport had 29,000 aircraft operations, an average of 79 per day: 97% general aviation and 3% air taxi. At that time there were 35 aircraft based at this airport: 80% single-engine, 6% multi-engine, and 14% ultralight.

References

External links 
 Aerial image as of March 2000 and topographic map from USGS The National Map
 

Airports in Arkansas
Transportation in Union County, Arkansas
Buildings and structures in El Dorado, Arkansas